Yehoshua Shalem (born 1 August 1944) is an Israeli former professional tennis player.

Often referred to by his childhood nickname "Shuka", Shalem was raised in the Jerusalem neighbourhood Rehavia. His father, an immigrant from Thessaloniki, had been a tennis player good enough to win the Palestinian championship.

Shalem was the Israeli national singles champion nine successive times between 1967 and 1975. In addition he won the Israel International Championship in 1974, becoming the first local to win in 12 years. He represented the Israel Davis Cup team in a total of 10 ties and was a singles bronze medalist for Israel at the 1974 Asian Games in Tehran.

See also
List of Israel Davis Cup team representatives

References

External links
 
 

1944 births
Living people
Israeli male tennis players
Medalists at the 1974 Asian Games
Asian Games bronze medalists for Israel
Asian Games medalists in tennis
Tennis players at the 1974 Asian Games
Israeli people of Greek-Jewish descent
Sportspeople from Jerusalem